Georgeson is a surname of English origin. It is a patronymic form of the name George. Notable people with the surname include:

Charles Christian Georgeson (1851–1931), agronomist, born on Langeland, Denmark
Chelsea Georgeson (born 1983), Australian surfer who won the world title in 2005
Noah Georgeson (born 1975), American musician, producer, and solo recording artist
Roddy Georgeson (born 1948), Egyptian former footballer
Rosemary Georgeson, Canadian multi-media artist
Tom Georgeson (born 1937), British actor, known for his television and film work

See also
Georgeson Botanical Garden, botanical garden on the University of Alaska Fairbanks campus in Fairbanks, Alaska, USA

References

English-language surnames
Patronymic surnames
Surnames from given names